Madeleine Michèle Ngono Mani Epse Ongueme (born 16 October 1983), known as Madeleine Ngono Mani, is a Cameroonian football striker currently playing for Albi Croix in the French second tier. She is a member of the Cameroonian national team, with which she has played the 2012 Summer Olympics, the African Women's Championship, and the 2015 FIFA Women's World Cup.

Career

Club
Her career started with Lorema FC and Canon Yaoundé, winning the domestic cup and league twice each in Cameroon . After the domestic success, she joined RC Saint-Étienne in 2003, then in the fourth tier of French football. The team merged with AS Saint-Étienne in 2009, after their exploits leading them to the top level of French football, in no small part due to Ngono Mani's goal-scoring abilities. She then joined ASJ Soyaux and became one of their leading goal scorers in the second division. She turned professional by joining Guingamp in 2011 following a brief spell with FCF Monteux. She moved to Claix in 2013 after a fruitful two years with Guingamp. In 2015, she transferred to FC Minsk, with quite lucrative terms.

For the 2016–17 she moved to Aurillac Arpajon, in the French second tier. In 2018 she plays for Albi Croix.

International
She debuted in the World Cup qualifier against South Africa in 2002, in a 2–1 loss. In the 2012 Summer Olympics in London, United Kingdom, she played all three matches of the group stage of the women's football tournament, but the team did not manage to gain a single point and failed to qualify for the following round. She played a key role in Cameroon's campaign in the 2015 FIFA Women's World Cup, scoring a header to complete a comeback win against Switzerland, as well as scoring in the 6–0 rout of Ecuador. She is also the top scorer of the national team.

Honours
 Ligue Rhône-Alpes de football: 2003–04

References

External links
 

1983 births
Living people
Cameroonian women's footballers
Footballers at the 2012 Summer Olympics
Olympic footballers of Cameroon
2015 FIFA Women's World Cup players
AS Saint-Étienne (women) players
En Avant Guingamp (women) players
ASJ Soyaux-Charente players
FC Minsk (women) players
ASPTT Albi players
Expatriate women's footballers in France
Cameroonian expatriate sportspeople in France
Women's association football forwards
Cameroon women's international footballers
Cameroonian expatriate women's footballers
People from Centre Region (Cameroon)
African Games silver medalists for Cameroon
African Games medalists in football
Competitors at the 2015 African Games
2019 FIFA Women's World Cup players
Division 1 Féminine players
20th-century Cameroonian women
21st-century Cameroonian women